Quotient is the result of division in mathematics.

Quotient may also refer to:

Mathematics
 Quotient set by an equivalence relation
 Quotient group
 Quotient ring
 Quotient module
 Quotient space (linear algebra)
 Quotient space (topology), by an equivalence relation in the case of a topological space
 Quotient (universal algebra)
 Quotient object in a category
 Quotient category
 Quotient of a formal language
 Quotient type

Other uses
 Intelligence quotient, a psychological measurement of human intelligence
 Quotient Technology, the parent company of Coupons.com
 Quotients (EP), music by the band Hyland
 Runs Per Wicket Ratio, a statistic used to rank teams in league tables in cricket, also known as Quotient